The 1997–98 New York Rangers season was the franchise's 72nd season. The Rangers posted a 25–39–18 record in the regular season and finished in fifth place in the Atlantic Division. New York missed the Stanley Cup playoffs for the first time since the 1992–93 season.

The Rangers fired head coach Colin Campbell during the season and replaced him with former Edmonton Oilers Stanley Cup-winning coach John Muckler. This was also the first season since the 1990–91 campaign that the Rangers did not have Mark Messier; after a contentious negotiating period, the Rangers elected not to re-sign Messier and he instead joined the Vancouver Canucks.

Regular season
The Rangers were the only team in the league not to score a short-handed goal.

Final standings

Schedule and results

|- align="center" bgcolor="white"
| 1 || 3 || New York Islanders || 2 - 2 OT || 0-0-1
|- align="center" bgcolor="white"
| 2 || 5 || Los Angeles Kings || 2 - 2 OT || 0-0-2
|- align="center" bgcolor="white"
| 3 || 8 || @ Edmonton Oilers || 3 - 3 OT || 0-0-3
|- align="center" bgcolor="white"
| 4 || 9 || @ Calgary Flames || 1 - 1 OT || 0-0-4
|- align="center" bgcolor="#ccffcc"
| 5 || 11 || @ Vancouver Canucks || 6 - 3 || 1-0-4
|- align="center" bgcolor="#ffbbbb"
| 6 || 14 || Pittsburgh Penguins || 1 - 0 || 1-1-4
|- align="center" bgcolor="#ffbbbb"
| 7 || 15 || @ Ottawa Senators || 5 - 1 || 1-2-4
|- align="center" bgcolor="#ffbbbb"
| 8 || 18 || @ St. Louis Blues || 5 - 3 || 1-3-4
|- align="center" bgcolor="#ccffcc"
| 9 || 20 || Carolina Hurricanes || 4 - 2 || 2-3-4
|- align="center" bgcolor="#ffbbbb"
| 10 || 22 || Chicago Blackhawks || 1 - 0 || 2-4-4
|- align="center" bgcolor="#ccffcc"
| 11 || 24 || Tampa Bay Lightning || 4 - 3 || 3-4-4
|- align="center" bgcolor="white"
| 12 || 26 || Mighty Ducks of Anaheim || 3 - 3 OT || 3-4-5
|- align="center" bgcolor="#ffbbbb"
| 13 || 28 || Dallas Stars || 3 - 2 || 3-5-5
|- align="center" bgcolor="#ffbbbb"
| 14 || 30 || @ New York Islanders || 5 - 3 || 3-6-5
|-

|- align="center" bgcolor="white"
| 15 || 3 || Edmonton Oilers || 2 - 2 OT || 3-6-6
|- align="center" bgcolor="#ccffcc"
| 16 || 5 || @ Colorado Avalanche || 4 - 2 || 4-6-6
|- align="center" bgcolor="white"
| 17 || 7 || @ Dallas Stars || 2 - 2 OT || 4-6-7
|- align="center" bgcolor="#ffbbbb"
| 18 || 12 || New Jersey Devils || 3 - 2 || 4-7-7
|- align="center" bgcolor="#ccffcc"
| 19 || 14 || Pittsburgh Penguins || 3 - 1 || 5-7-7
|- align="center" bgcolor="#ccffcc"
| 20 || 16 || Colorado Avalanche || 4 - 1 || 6-7-7
|- align="center" bgcolor="#ccffcc"
| 21 || 18 || @ Florida Panthers || 3 - 1 || 7-7-7
|- align="center" bgcolor="#ffbbbb"
| 22 || 19 || @ Tampa Bay Lightning || 6 - 3 || 7-8-7
|- align="center" bgcolor="#ccffcc"
| 23 || 21 || @ Carolina Hurricanes || 4 - 3 || 8-8-7
|- align="center" bgcolor="#ffbbbb"
| 24 || 22 || @ Pittsburgh Penguins || 4 - 3 OT || 8-9-7
|- align="center" bgcolor="#ffbbbb"
| 25 || 25 || Vancouver Canucks || 4 - 2 || 8-10-7
|- align="center" bgcolor="#ffbbbb"
| 26 || 26 || @ New York Islanders || 4 - 1 || 8-11-7
|- align="center" bgcolor="white"
| 27 || 28 || @ Buffalo Sabres || 3 - 3 OT || 8-11-8
|- align="center" bgcolor="white"
| 28 || 30 || Florida Panthers || 1 - 1 OT || 8-11-9
|-

|- align="center" bgcolor="#ffbbbb"
| 29 || 2 || Washington Capitals || 3 - 2 OT || 8-12-9
|- align="center" bgcolor="white"
| 30 || 5 || Philadelphia Flyers || 4 - 4 OT || 8-12-10
|- align="center" bgcolor="white"
| 31 || 6 || @ Montreal Canadiens || 3 - 3 OT || 8-12-11
|- align="center" bgcolor="#ccffcc"
| 32 || 8 || Phoenix Coyotes || 3 - 1 || 9-12-11
|- align="center" bgcolor="#ffbbbb"
| 33 || 10 || Calgary Flames || 4 - 1 || 9-13-11
|- align="center" bgcolor="#ffbbbb"
| 34 || 12 || Florida Panthers || 4 - 3 || 9-14-11
|- align="center" bgcolor="#ffbbbb"
| 35 || 16 || @ New Jersey Devils || 4 - 3 || 9-15-11
|- align="center" bgcolor="#ccffcc"
| 36 || 17 || @ Florida Panthers || 4 - 2 || 10-15-11
|- align="center" bgcolor="white"
| 37 || 20 || @ Tampa Bay Lightning || 2 - 2 OT || 10-15-12
|- align="center" bgcolor="#ffbbbb"
| 38 || 21 || Buffalo Sabres || 2 - 0 || 10-16-12
|- align="center" bgcolor="#ccffcc"
| 39 || 23 || Tampa Bay Lightning || 4 - 1 || 11-16-12
|- align="center" bgcolor="#ffbbbb"
| 40 || 26 || @ Buffalo Sabres || 3 - 0 || 11-17-12
|- align="center" bgcolor="#ccffcc"
| 41 || 28 || Boston Bruins || 4 - 3 || 12-17-12
|- align="center" bgcolor="#ffbbbb"
| 42 || 31 || @ Tampa Bay Lightning || 2 - 0 || 12-18-12
|-

|- align="center" bgcolor="#ccffcc"
| 43 || 3 || @ Washington Capitals || 3 - 2 || 13-18-12
|- align="center" bgcolor="#ccffcc"
| 44 || 6 || Carolina Hurricanes || 4 - 2 || 14-18-12
|- align="center" bgcolor="#ffbbbb"
| 45 || 8 || Washington Capitals || 5 - 3 || 14-19-12
|- align="center" bgcolor="#ccffcc"
| 46 || 12 || Toronto Maple Leafs || 3 - 2 || 15-19-12
|- align="center" bgcolor="#ffbbbb"
| 47 || 14 || @ New Jersey Devils || 4 - 1 || 15-20-12
|- align="center" bgcolor="#ccffcc"
| 48 || 20 || St. Louis Blues || 3 - 1 || 16-20-12
|- align="center" bgcolor="#ffbbbb"
| 49 || 22 || Philadelphia Flyers || 4 - 3 || 16-21-12
|- align="center" bgcolor="white"
| 50 || 24 || New Jersey Devils || 3 - 3 OT || 16-21-13
|- align="center" bgcolor="white"
| 51 || 26 || Washington Capitals || 2 - 2 OT || 16-21-14
|- align="center" bgcolor="white"
| 52 || 29 || @ Ottawa Senators || 2 - 2 OT || 16-21-15
|- align="center" bgcolor="#ffbbbb"
| 53 || 31 || @ Boston Bruins || 4 - 2 || 16-22-15
|-

|- align="center" bgcolor="#ccffcc"
| 54 || 2 || @ San Jose Sharks || 3 - 2 || 17-22-15
|- align="center" bgcolor="#ffbbbb"
| 55 || 4 || @ Mighty Ducks of Anaheim || 3 - 2 || 17-23-15
|- align="center" bgcolor="#ffbbbb"
| 56 || 5 || @ Los Angeles Kings || 3 - 1 || 17-24-15
|- align="center" bgcolor="white"
| 57 || 7 || @ Phoenix Coyotes || 1 - 1 OT || 17-24-16
|- align="center" bgcolor="#ccffcc"
| 58 || 26 || @ Toronto Maple Leafs || 5 - 2 || 18-24-16
|- align="center" bgcolor="#ffbbbb"
| 59 || 28 || Philadelphia Flyers || 3 - 1 || 18-25-16
|-

|- align="center" bgcolor="#ffbbbb"
| 60 || 2 || Buffalo Sabres || 1 - 0 || 18-26-16
|- align="center" bgcolor="#ccffcc"
| 61 || 4 || @ Florida Panthers || 4 - 3 || 19-26-16
|- align="center" bgcolor="#ffbbbb"
| 62 || 7 || @ New Jersey Devils || 6 - 3 || 19-27-16
|- align="center" bgcolor="white"
| 63 || 9 || New Jersey Devils || 2 - 2 OT || 19-27-17
|- align="center" bgcolor="#ccffcc"
| 64 || 11 || San Jose Sharks || 5 - 3 || 20-27-17
|- align="center" bgcolor="#ffbbbb"
| 65 || 12 || @ Montreal Canadiens || 4 - 1 || 20-28-17
|- align="center" bgcolor="#ffbbbb"
| 66 || 14 || @ Boston Bruins || 5 - 1 || 20-29-17
|- align="center" bgcolor="#ccffcc"
| 67 || 16 || Ottawa Senators || 5 - 4 || 21-29-17
|- align="center" bgcolor="#ccffcc"
| 68 || 18 || Montreal Canadiens || 2 - 1 OT || 22-29-17
|- align="center" bgcolor="#ffbbbb"
| 69 || 21 || Detroit Red Wings || 4 - 3 || 22-30-17
|- align="center" bgcolor="#ffbbbb"
| 70 || 22 || @ Philadelphia Flyers || 5 - 4 OT || 22-31-17
|- align="center" bgcolor="#ffbbbb"
| 71 || 25 || Ottawa Senators || 3 - 2 OT || 22-32-17
|- align="center" bgcolor="#ffbbbb"
| 72 || 26 || @ Carolina Hurricanes || 4 - 1 || 22-33-17
|- align="center" bgcolor="white"
| 73 || 28 || @ Pittsburgh Penguins || 2 - 2 OT || 22-33-18
|- align="center" bgcolor="#ffbbbb"
| 74 || 30 || Tampa Bay Lightning || 3 - 1 || 22-34-18
|-

|- align="center" bgcolor="#ffbbbb"
| 75 || 1 || Boston Bruins || 4 - 2 || 22-35-18
|- align="center" bgcolor="#ffbbbb"
| 76 || 4 || @ New York Islanders || 3 - 0 || 22-36-18
|- align="center" bgcolor="#ccffcc"
| 77 || 5 || @ Chicago Blackhawks || 2 - 1 OT || 23-36-18
|- align="center" bgcolor="#ffbbbb"
| 78 || 7 || Montreal Canadiens || 3 - 2 || 23-37-18
|- align="center" bgcolor="#ffbbbb"
| 79 || 11 || @ Detroit Red Wings || 5 - 2 || 23-38-18
|- align="center" bgcolor="#ffbbbb"
| 80 || 14 || @ Washington Capitals || 3 - 1 || 23-39-18
|- align="center" bgcolor="#ccffcc"
| 81 || 15 || New York Islanders || 4 - 2 || 24-39-18
|- align="center" bgcolor="#ccffcc"
| 82 || 18 || @ Philadelphia Flyers || 2 - 1 || 25-39-18
|-

Player statistics
Skaters

Goaltenders

†Denotes player spent time with another team before joining Rangers. Stats reflect time with Rangers only.
‡Traded mid-season. Stats reflect time with Rangers only.

Draft picks
New York's picks at the 1997 NHL Entry Draft in Pittsburgh, Pennsylvania at the Civic Arena.

See also
 1997–98 NHL season

References

New York Rangers seasons
New York Rangers
New York Rangers
New York Rangers
New York Rangers
1990s in Manhattan
Madison Square Garden